Dragon Moon is a children's fantasy novel by Carole Wilkinson, first published in 2007. It is the third book of the Dragonkeeper series. The books before it are Dragonkeeper and Garden of the Purple Dragon. It is followed by Blood Brothers, Shadow Sisters and Bronze Bird Tower  The trilogy, based in ancient China, during the Han Dynasty, has won many awards. Dragon Moon continues the story of the Dragonkeeper Ping, as she tries to fulfill her first dragon's wishes to care for his son, Kai, and take him to the Dragon Haven, where he can be raised by his own kind.

Plot
When the story starts out Liu Che, (Ping's former friend and the emperor of China), has his troops attack the Duke of Yan's palace where Ping has been living for a year, because he believes that they kidnapped his former imperial dragon Kai. Meanwhile, Ping decides to wake Kai up from his winter hibernation for his safety, and finds that he has not only grown greatly in size, but knowledge as well. Ping leaves the palace with Kai to search for the Dragon Haven to further insure his safety. On the way, they find the emperor, Liu Che, wounded with a shard of Kai's dragon stone in his hand. He repents his crimes and decides to abandon his quest for immortality. At the morning, Ping refuses his offer of love and continues on her journey. As they near the Great Wall of China, they are held hostage by imperial soldiers, who ignore her claim of being the Dragonkeeper. Kai and her are then rescued by barbarians, who also give them a horse. On the way, she meets Jun, and together they find an old man, "Lao Long Zi", one of Danzi's former dragon keepers, at Tinkling Village. He brings them most of the way to Long Gao Yuan before dying. After getting there, however, Ping discovers only a heap of dragon bones from a massacre by dragon hunters. Ping and Kai are discouraged, and Kai refuses to leave. One day, a yellow dragon swoops down from the sky and carries Kai away. Ping stumbles towards the mountain in a half-dead state, until she too is picked up by the dragon (not too gently), who also spits in her face, in order to hide the location of the Dragon Haven from her, and brought to the real, current dragon haven. There, she learns that many years ago, Hei Lei's dragon keeper had abandoned him for a woman, and that his girlfriend, in her old age, had then betrayed the location of the dragon haven to a band of dragon hunters for three pieces of gold. They had killed many of the dragons in hibernation. Only Hei Lei, the black dragon, was awake, and attacked the hunters just in time. Still, they managed to get away with many dead dragons in their greedy hands, with only a handful escaping. Ping is distraught as she watches Kai pick up many of the wild dragons' habits and feels him slowly drawing away from her. During a moon gathering, Kai and Hei Lei end up in a fight, and Kai, who wins, is revealed to be a "dragon of five colors" (green, yellow, black, white, and red). A "dragon of five colors" will automatically assume the position of leader (and no one can challenge him, as the dragons formerly had none). Ping eventually wins the trust and friendship of all the dragons, but realizes that she does not belong with the other dragons, and decided to leave, despite Kai's wish for her to stay till spring. She is taken away from the Haven, and dropped in an empty grassland, where she is rescued by Hei Lei, who she manages to convince to go back to the Dragon Haven. The book ends with Ping beginning a new life with Jun, as she saw in one of her visions of her future.

Major characters
 Ping – Ping is the main protagonist of the Dragonkeeper series. She was formerly a slave girl, working in the Huangling Mountains until a dragon named Long Danzi took her away from her life and raised her to be a Dragonkeeper. She was the current Dragonkeeper of Kai, whom she raised since he was a baby.
 Kai – Kai is Ping's green (formerly purple) dragon, a young premature dragon who enjoys eating and playing games. Though he may be mischievous, he shows feelings for Ping and respects her. Kai is the son of Long Danzi, Ping's former dragon, as well as the Dragon of Five Colours, and the leader of the dragons.
 Jun – Jun is Ping's companion whom she meets throughout the book. Jun was formerly a boy from a poor village who tried to take Ping's position as Dragonkeeper until he turned against the Emperor. He is now a young man whom travels across China to sell silk. In the end they live together.
 Gu Hong – Gu Hong is the elder red dragon in the dragon haven. Though she has never been raised by a Dragonkeeper, she can still communicate to Ping by writing Chinese characters in the dirt. She is apparently the oldest dragon in the Dragon Haven. Her name means "Ancient Red". In the end, Ping learns to understand her, but they still choose to communicate via Chinese characters.
 Jiang – Jiang is Gu Hong's daughter. Unlike her mother, Jiang has been raised by another Dragonkeeper. Thus she is able to communicate to Ping like she can with Kai. Her name meaning is "Ginger".
 Hei Lei – Hei Lei is a massive black dragon who is supposedly the leader of the dragons. He has a fierce hatred towards all humans including Ping. Hei Lei once had a Dragonkeeper whom left him for a woman he loved leaving Hei Lei betrayed. Hei Lei once challenged Danzi who was once leader of the dragons and later is challenged by Kai for insulting Danzi. Embarrassed, Hei Lei leaves the Dragon Haven. The name Hei Lei means "Black Thunder". At the end of the book, Ping convinces Hei Lei to return to the Dragon Haven.
 Tun – Tun is a male yellow dragon whom lost his sister during the dragon massacre. Like Hei Lei, he shows some dislike towards all humans including Ping at first. In the end, he accepts her in the Dragon Haven. His name meaning is "Morning Sunlight"
 Sha – Sha is a shy female yellow dragon whom acts as a healer within the Dragon haven. She is Tun's mate and has laid three dragon eggs which were already dead when they were laid. The name Sha means "Sandy".
 The three white dragons – The three white dragon sisters: Bai Xue, Shuang and Lian act as the scouts of the Dragon Haven. They possess the shapeshifting ability to turn themselves into white eagles. Their mother was one of the many dragons who were killed during the dragon massacre. Their names meanings are "White Snow", "Frost" and "Lotus" respectively.
 Lao Long Zi – He is the former Dragonkeeper of Long Danzi who aids Ping throughout her journey. Because he started to lose his sense of hearing, he is forced to leave Danzi and his role as Dragonkeeper because dragons have poor hearing. Since then, he is shunned by many people from Tinkling Village. He leads her to Long Gao Yuan before passing away.

Dragon Dawn
Carole Wilkinson wrote a short prequel called Dragon Dawn. Based on Danzi's past, it does not mention Ping or any recent characters in it except for a few minors.

References

2007 Australian novels
Dragonkeeper books
CBCA Children's Book of the Year Award-winning works
2007 children's books
COOL Award-winning works